In organosulfur chemistry, a sulfonyl group can refer either to a functional group found primarily in sulfones, or to a substituent obtained from a sulfonic acid by the removal of the hydroxyl group, similarly to acyl groups. Sulfonyl groups can be written as having the general formula , where there are two double bonds between the sulfur and oxygen.

Sulfonyl groups can be reduced to the sulfide with DIBALH. Lithium aluminium hydride reduces some but not all sulfones to sulfides.

In inorganic chemistry, when the group  is not connected to any carbon atoms, it is referred to as sulfuryl.

Examples of sulfonyl group substituents
The names of sulfonyl groups typically end in -syl, such as:

{| class=wikitable
!Group name
!Full name
!Pseudoelement symbol
!Example
|-
|Tosyl
|p-toluenesulfonyl
|Ts
|Tosyl chloride (p-toluenesulfonyl chloride)CH3C6H4SO2Cl
|-
|Brosyl
|p-bromobenzenesulfonyl
|Bs
|
|-
|Nosyl
|o- or p-nitrobenzenesulfonyl
|Ns
|
|-
|Mesyl
|methanesulfonyl
|Ms
|Mesyl chloride (methanesulfonyl chloride)CH3SO2Cl
|-
|Triflyl
|trifluoromethanesulfonyl
|Tf
|
|-
|Tresyl
|2,2,2-trifluoroethyl-1-sulfonyl
|
|
|-
|Dansyl
|5-(dimethylamino)naphthalene-1-sulfonyl 
|Ds
|Dansyl chloride

|}

See also
 Sulfonyl halide
 Sulfonamide
 Sulfonate
 Methylsulfonylmethane (MSM)

References

Functional groups

Organosulfur compounds